Reg Pollard may refer to:

 Reg Pollard (politician) (1894–1981), Australian politician
 Sir Reg Pollard (general) (1903–1978), Australian general